The flag of Tallinn consists of three blue and three white horizontal bars. The ratio of length and width is 1:2 and normal size is 1600×800 mm.

See also
Coat of arms of Tallinn

References

Tallinn
Culture in Tallinn
History of Tallinn